Soetdoring Nature Reserve is a nature reserve in Free State, South Africa. The Modder River passes through it.

References

Nature reserves in South Africa
Protected areas of the Free State (province)